The Northern 300 was a NASCAR Winston Cup Series stock car race held in 1958, 1959, and from 1967 to 1972 at Trenton Speedway in Trenton, New Jersey. The 1967 and 1968 races were both 300 laps, covering . The track was lengthened from 1 mile to 1.5 miles for 1969, and the final four races were cut down from 300 to 200 laps, while still covering a 300-mile distance.

A race in Trenton was on the 1973 schedule but was rained out on race day and ultimately cancelled. A 1974 race was on the Winston Cup schedule before the season, but was replaced by the Purolator 500 at Pocono Raceway. Richard Petty was the only driver to win more than once at Trenton, winning three times.

Past winners

Multiple winners (drivers)

Multiple winners (teams)

Manufacturer wins

References

External links
 

1958 establishments in New Jersey
1972 disestablishments in New Jersey
Former NASCAR races
 
Recurring events disestablished in 1972
Recurring sporting events established in 1958